American DJ and record producer Diplo has released two studio albums, ten EPs, six compilation albums, four mixtapes, one live album and a series of singles, music videos and other appearances. His alias, short for Diplodocus, derives from his childhood fascination with dinosaurs. During his rise to fame, Diplo worked with British musician M.I.A., an artist who is credited with giving him exposure in his early career. Since then, Diplo has worked on production and mixtape projects with many other pop artists, such as Die Antwoord, Britney Spears, Madonna, Shakira, Beyoncé, No Doubt, Justin Bieber, Usher, Snoop Dogg, Chris Brown, CL, and G-Dragon. As an artist, Diplo, combined with his other collaborations Major Lazer, Jack Ü and Silk City, three electronic groups.

Albums

Studio albums

Compilation albums

Mixtapes

Live albums

Extended plays

Singles

As lead artist

As featured artist

Other charted songs

Other appearances

See also
Diplo production discography

Notes

References

Discography
Discographies of American artists
Pop music discographies